Constantino is a Greek/Portuguese/Spanish given name, also an Italian surname. It is derived from Latin Constantinus. Constantino may refer to:

Constantino Barza
Constantino Brumidi
Constantino Cajetan
Constantino of Braganza
Constantino de Castro
Constantino Chiwenga
Constantino Mollitsas
 Florencio Constantino (1869-1919), Spanish operatic tenor
Phil Constantino
Renato Constantino (1919-1999), Filipino historian

See also
Costantino
Constantine (disambiguation)
Constantina (disambiguation)